Risk is German thrash/speed metal band from Witten. Founded in 1986, they notably released five albums and one EP on Steamhammer Records.

Discography
 The Daily Horror News (1988, Steamhammer Records)
 Hell's Animals (1989, Steamhammer Records)
 Ratman EP (1989, Steamhammer Records)
 Dirty Surfaces (1990, Steamhammer Records)
 The Reborn (1992, Steamhammer Records)
 Turpitude (1993, Steamhammer Records)

References

External links 
 

German thrash metal musical groups
Musical groups established in 1986
Musical groups disestablished in 1993